Little Prairie is an unincorporated community located in the town of Troy, Walworth County, Wisconsin, United States.

Notable people
Adam E. Ray, Wisconsin state and territorial legislator and businessman, owned a tavern in Little Prairie.

Notes

Unincorporated communities in Walworth County, Wisconsin
Unincorporated communities in Wisconsin